Jimmy Dale "Red" Parker (October 26, 1931 – January 4, 2016) was an American football coach. From 1961 to 1965, he served as the head football coach at the University of Arkansas at Monticello, where he compiled a 29–19–2 record. From 1966 to 1972, he coached at The Citadel in South Carolina. He compiled a 46–37 record there. From 1973 to 1976, he coached at Clemson University, where he compiled a 17–25–2 record. In 1981, he coached at Southern Arkansas University, where he compiled a 7–3 record. From 1982 to 1987, he coached at Delta State University. From 1996 to 1998, he coached at Ouachita Baptist University where he compiled a 10–20 record. 

Parker was named the first high school football coach for the Harmony Grove Cardinals, in Benton, Arkansas. His team won the school's first varsity game against Poyen High School Indians on September 3, 2010, by a score of 35–14. He announced his resignation from Harmony Grove on October 28, 2015, effective at the end of the 2015 season, citing health reasons. He died on January 4, 2016, from complications of heart disease.

Head coaching record

College

References

1931 births
2016 deaths
Arkansas–Monticello Boll Weevils football players
Arkansas–Monticello Boll Weevils football coaches
The Citadel Bulldogs football coaches
Clemson Tigers football coaches
Delta State Statesmen football coaches
Ole Miss Rebels football coaches
Ouachita Baptist Tigers football coaches
Southern Arkansas Muleriders football coaches
Vanderbilt Commodores football coaches
High school football coaches in Arkansas
People from Magnolia, Arkansas